34-Laksar Legislative Assembly constituency is one of the seventy electoral Uttarakhand Legislative Assembly constituencies of Uttarakhand state in India. It includes Laksar area.

Laksar Legislative Assembly constituency is a part of Haridwar (Lok Sabha constituency).

Members of Legislative Assembly

Election results

2022

References

External link
  

Haridwar
Assembly constituencies of Uttarakhand